Rino Benedetti (18 November 1928 in Ponte Buggianese – 14 June 2002) was an Italian professional road bicycle racer, who won stages in all the three Grand Tours.

Major results

1950
Gran Premio Montanino
1951
Giro del Mendrisiotto
1952
Giro d'Italia:
Winner stage 8
1953
Gran Premio Industria e Commercio di Prato
1954
Coppa Sabatini
1955
Trofeo Fenaroli
Giro della Provincia di Reggio Calabria
Giro d'Italia:
Winner stages 8 and 16
1956
Giro d'Italia
 stage 2b (team time trial)
1957
Vuelta a España:
Winner stage 9
1958
Tour de Suisse
 Winner stage 2 and 4
Giro di Sicilia
 Winner stage 2 and 4
Coppa Città di Busto Arsizio
1959
Coppa Sabatini
Giro del Veneto
Giro di Campania
Giro d'Italia:
Winner stage 10
1961
GP Industria/Quarrata
Trofeo Fenaroli
Four Days of Dunkirk
 Winner stage 1a   
1962
Tour de France:
Winner stage 22
 Volta a Catalunya
Winner stage 2

External links 

Official Tour de France results for Rino Benedetti

Italian male cyclists
1928 births
Italian Tour de France stage winners
Italian Giro d'Italia stage winners
Italian Vuelta a España stage winners
2002 deaths
Sportspeople from the Province of Pistoia
Tour de Suisse stage winners
Cyclists from Tuscany